Rasa Raj Mandal was a Member of the 2nd National Assembly of Pakistan as a representative of East Pakistan.

Career
Mandal was a Member of the 2nd National Assembly of Pakistan. On 26 September 1953, he was sworn in as the State Minister of Economics. He was the General Secretary of the East Bengal Scheduled Castes Federation.

References

Pakistani MNAs 1955–1958
Living people
Year of birth missing (living people)